Hisham A. Munir is an Iraqi architect known for pioneering architectural modernism in Iraq.

Early life 
Hisham A. Munir was born in February, 1930 in Baghdad, Mandatory Iraq. He studied at the American University of Beirut, University of Texas at Austin School of Architecture, and University of Southern California, finishing his education in 1956.

Career 
In 1959 Munir established Iraq's first architecture program at the University of Baghdad with Mohamed Makiya and Abdullah Ihsan Kamel.

In 1957 Muir worked with German architect Walter Gropius and his firm, The Architects Collaborative, in the design of the campus of the University of Baghdad. Munir designed a number of major projects in the following three decades including the University of Mosul campus (1966),  Iraqi Ministry of Interior (1974), Baghdad City Hall (1975), and Ishtar Sheraton Hotel & Casino in Baghdad (1982).

Awards and honours
In 2017, Hisham received the Tamayouz Excellence Award for Lifetime Achievement.

References 

Iraqi architects
1930 births
People from Baghdad
Living people